Thriambeutis hemicausta is a species of moth of the  family Heliodinidae. This species is known from the Solomons (Isabel island).

It has a wingspan of 21 mm. The forewings are reddish-orange with a purple-blackish apical patch occupying rather more than half the wing, the anterior edge irregular. The hindwings are reddish-orange with the apical half blackish, the division between these irregular.

References

Heliodinidae
Moths of the Solomon islands
Moths described in 1910